Wind power or wind energy is mostly the use of wind turbines to generate electricity. Wind power is a popular, sustainable, renewable energy source that has a much smaller impact on the environment than burning fossil fuels. Historically, wind power has been used in sails, windmills and windpumps but today it is mostly used to generate electricity. Wind farms consist of many individual wind turbines, which are connected to the electric power transmission network. New onshore (on-land) wind farms are cheaper than new coal or gas plants, but expansion of wind power is being hindered by fossil fuel subsidies. Onshore wind farms have a greater visual impact on the landscape than some other power stations. Small onshore wind farms can feed some energy into the grid or provide power to isolated off-grid locations. Offshore wind farms deliver more energy per installed capacity with less fluctuations and have less visual impact. Although there is less offshore wind power at present and construction and maintenance costs are higher, it is expanding. Offshore wind power currently has a share of about 10% of new installations.

Wind power is variable renewable energy, so power-management techniques are used to match supply and demand, such as: wind hybrid power systems, hydroelectric power or other dispatchable power sources, excess capacity, geographically distributed turbines, exporting and importing power to neighboring areas, or grid storage. As the proportion of wind power in a region increases the grid may need to be upgraded. Weather forecasting allows the electric-power network to be readied for the predictable variations in production that occur.

In 2021, wind supplied over 1800 TWh of electricity, which was over 6% of world electricity and about 2% of world energy. With about 100 GW added during 2021, mostly in China and the United States, global installed wind power capacity exceeded 800 GW. To help meet the Paris Agreement goals to limit climate change, analysts say it should expand much faster - by over 1% of electricity generation per year.

Regions in the higher northern and southern latitudes have the highest potential for wind power. In most regions, wind power generation is higher in nighttime, and in winter when PV output is low. For this reason, combinations of wind and solar power are suitable in many countries.

Wind energy 

Wind energy is the kinetic energy of air in motion, also called wind.
Total wind energy flowing through an imaginary surface with area A during the time t is:

where ρ is the density of air; v is the wind speed; Avt is the volume of air passing through A (which is considered perpendicular to the direction of the wind); Avtρ is therefore the mass m passing through A.  ρv2 is the kinetic energy of the moving air per unit volume.

Power is energy per unit time, so the wind power incident on A (e.g. equal to the rotor area of a wind turbine) is:

Wind power in an open air stream is thus proportional to the third power of the wind speed; the available power increases eightfold when the wind speed doubles.

Wind is the movement of air across the surface of the Earth, driven by areas of high and low pressure.
The global wind kinetic energy averaged approximately 1.50 MJ/m2 over the period from 1979 to 2010, 1.31 MJ/m2 in the Northern Hemisphere with 1.70 MJ/m2 in the Southern Hemisphere. The atmosphere acts as a thermal engine, absorbing heat at higher temperatures, releasing heat at lower temperatures. The process is responsible for the production of wind kinetic energy at a rate of 2.46 W/m2 thus sustaining the circulation of the atmosphere against friction.

Through wind resource assessment, it is possible to estimate wind power potential globally, by country or region, or for a specific site. The Global Wind Atlas provided by the Technical University of Denmark in partnership with the World Bank provides a global assessment of wind power potential.
Unlike 'static' wind resource atlases which average estimates of wind speed and power density across multiple years, tools such as Renewables.ninja provide time-varying simulations of wind speed and power output from different wind turbine models at an hourly resolution. More detailed, site-specific assessments of wind resource potential can be obtained from specialist commercial providers, and many of the larger wind developers have in-house modeling capabilities.

The total amount of economically extractable power available from the wind is considerably more than present human power use from all sources. The strength of wind varies, and an average value for a given location does not alone indicate the amount of energy a wind turbine could produce there.

To assess prospective wind power sites, a probability distribution function is often fit to the observed wind speed data. Different locations will have different wind speed distributions. The Weibull model closely mirrors the actual distribution of hourly/ten-minute wind speeds at many locations. The Weibull factor is often close to 2 and therefore a Rayleigh distribution can be used as a less accurate, but simpler model.

Wind farms 

A wind farm is a group of wind turbines in the same location. A large wind farm may consist of several hundred individual wind turbines distributed over an extended area. The land between the turbines may be used for agricultural or other purposes. For example, Gansu Wind Farm, the largest wind farm in the world, has several thousand turbines. A wind farm may also be located offshore. Almost all large wind turbines have the same design — a horizontal axis wind turbine having an upwind rotor with 3 blades, attached to a nacelle on top of a tall tubular tower.

In a wind farm, individual turbines are interconnected with a medium voltage (often 34.5 kV) power collection system and communications network. In general, a distance of 7D (7 times the rotor diameter of the wind turbine) is set between each turbine in a fully developed wind farm. At a substation, this medium-voltage electric current is increased in voltage with a transformer for connection to the high voltage electric power transmission system.

Generator characteristics and stability 

Induction generators are not used in current turbines. Instead, most turbines use variable speed generators combined with either a partial or full-scale power converter between the turbine generator and the collector system, which generally have more desirable properties for grid interconnection and have low voltage ride through-capabilities. Modern turbines use either doubly fed electric machines with partial-scale converters or squirrel-cage induction generators or synchronous generators (both permanently and electrically excited) with full-scale converters. Black start is possible and is being further developed for places (such as Iowa) which generate most of their electricity from wind.

Transmission systems operators will supply a wind farm developer with a grid code to specify the requirements for interconnection to the transmission grid. This will include the power factor, the constancy of frequency, and the dynamic behaviour of the wind farm turbines during a system fault.

Offshore wind power 

Offshore wind power is wind farms in large bodies of water, usually the sea. These installations can use the more frequent and powerful winds that are available in these locations and have less visual impact on the landscape than land-based projects. However, the construction and maintenance costs are considerably higher.

As of November 2021, the Hornsea Wind Farm in the United Kingdom is the largest offshore wind farm in the world at 1,218 MW.

Collection and transmission network 
Near offshore wind farms may be connected by AC and far offshore by HVDC.

Wind power resources are not always located near to high population density. As transmission lines become longer, the losses associated with power transmission increase, as modes of losses at lower lengths are exacerbated and new modes of losses are no longer negligible as the length is increased; making it harder to transport large loads over large distances.

When the transmission capacity does not meet the generation capacity, wind farms are forced to produce below their full potential or stop running altogether, in a process known as curtailment. While this leads to potential renewable generation left untapped, it prevents possible grid overload or risk to reliable service.

One of the biggest current challenges to wind power grid integration in some countries is the necessity of developing new transmission lines to carry power from wind farms, usually in remote lowly populated areas due to availability of wind, to high load locations, usually on the coasts where population density is higher. Any existing transmission lines in remote locations may not have been designed for the transport of large amounts of energy. In particular geographic regions, peak wind speeds may not coincide with peak demand for electrical power, whether offshore or onshore. A possible future option may be to interconnect widely dispersed geographic areas with an HVDC super grid.

Wind power capacity and production

Growth trends 

In 2020, wind supplied almost 1600 TWh of electricity, which was over 5% of worldwide electrical generation and about 2% of energy consumption. With over 100 GW added during 2020, mostly in China, global installed wind power capacity reached more than 730 GW. But to help meet the Paris Agreement's goals to limit climate change, analysts say it should expand much faster - by over 1% of electricity generation per year. Expansion of wind power is being hindered by fossil fuel subsidies.

The actual amount of electric power that wind can generate is calculated by multiplying the nameplate capacity by the capacity factor, which varies according to equipment and location. Estimates of the capacity factors for wind installations are in the range of 35% to 44%.

Capacity factor
Since wind speed is not constant, a wind farm's annual energy production is never as much as the sum of the generator nameplate ratings multiplied by the total hours in a year. The ratio of actual productivity in a year to this theoretical maximum is called the capacity factor. Online data is available for some locations, and the capacity factor can be calculated from the yearly output.

Penetration 

Wind energy penetration is the fraction of energy produced by wind compared with the total generation. Wind power's share of worldwide electricity usage in 2021 was almost 7%, up from 3.5% in 2015.

There is no generally accepted maximum level of wind penetration. The limit for a particular grid will depend on the existing generating plants, pricing mechanisms, capacity for energy storage, demand management, and other factors. An interconnected electric power grid will already include reserve generating and transmission capacity to allow for equipment failures. This reserve capacity can also serve to compensate for the varying power generation produced by wind stations. Studies have indicated that 20% of the total annual electrical energy consumption may be incorporated with minimal difficulty. These studies have been for locations with geographically dispersed wind farms, some degree of dispatchable energy or hydropower with storage capacity, demand management, and interconnected to a large grid area enabling the export of electric power when needed. Electrical utilities continue to study the effects of large-scale penetration of wind generation on system stability.

A wind energy penetration figure can be specified for different duration of time but is often quoted annually. To generate almost all electricity from wind annually requires substantial interconnection to other systems, for example some wind power in Scotland is sent to the rest of the British grid. On a monthly, weekly, daily, or hourly basis—or less—wind might supply as much as or more than 100% of current use, with the rest stored, exported or curtailed. The seasonal industry might then take advantage of high wind and low usage times such as at night when wind output can exceed normal demand. Such industry might include the production of silicon, aluminum, steel, or natural gas, and hydrogen, and using future long-term storage to facilitate 100% energy from variable renewable energy. Homes and businesses can also be programmed to vary electricity demand, for example by remotely turning up water heater thermostats.

Variability 

Wind power is variable, and during low wind periods, it may need to be replaced by other power sources. Transmission networks presently cope with outages of other generation plants and daily changes in electrical demand, but the variability of intermittent power sources such as wind power is more frequent than those of conventional power generation plants which, when scheduled to be operating, may be able to deliver their nameplate capacity around 95% of the time.

Electric power generated from wind power can be highly variable at several different timescales: hourly, daily, or seasonally. Annual variation also exists but is not as significant. Because instantaneous electrical generation and consumption must remain in balance to maintain grid stability, this variability can present substantial challenges to incorporating large amounts of wind power into a grid system. Intermittency and the non-dispatchable nature of wind energy production can raise costs for regulation, incremental operating reserve, and (at high penetration levels) could require an increase in the already existing energy demand management, load shedding, storage solutions, or system interconnection with HVDC cables.

Fluctuations in load and allowance for the failure of large fossil-fuel generating units require operating reserve capacity, which can be increased to compensate for the variability of wind generation.

Utility-scale batteries are often used to balance hourly and shorter timescale variation, but car batteries may gain ground from the mid-2020s. Wind power advocates argue that periods of low wind can be dealt with by simply restarting existing power stations that have been held in readiness, or interlinking with HVDC.

The combination of diversifying variable renewables by type and location, forecasting their variation, and integrating them with dispatchable renewables, flexible fueled generators, and demand response can create a power system that has the potential to meet power supply needs reliably. Integrating ever-higher levels of renewables is being successfully demonstrated in the real world.

Solar power tends to be complementary to wind. On daily to weekly timescales, high-pressure areas tend to bring clear skies and low surface winds, whereas low-pressure areas tend to be windier and cloudier. On seasonal timescales, solar energy peaks in summer, whereas in many areas wind energy is lower in summer and higher in winter. Thus the seasonal variation of wind and solar power tend to cancel each other somewhat. Wind hybrid power systems are becoming more popular.

Predictability

For any particular generator, there is an 80% chance that wind output will change less than 10% in an hour and a 40% chance that it will change 10% or more in 5 hours.

In summer 2021, wind power in the United Kingdom fell due to the lowest winds in seventy years, In the future, smoothing peaks by producing green hydrogen may help when wind has a larger share of generation.

While the output from a single turbine can vary greatly and rapidly as local wind speeds vary, as more turbines are connected over larger and larger areas the average power output becomes less variable and more predictable. Weather forecasting permits the electric-power network to be readied for the predictable variations in production that occur.

It is thought that the most reliable low-carbon electricity systems will include a large share of wind power.

Energy storage

Typically, conventional hydroelectricity complements wind power very well. When the wind is blowing strongly, nearby hydroelectric stations can temporarily hold back their water. When the wind drops they can, provided they have the generation capacity, rapidly increase production to compensate. This gives a very even overall power supply and virtually no loss of energy and uses no more water.

Alternatively, where a suitable head of water is not available, pumped-storage hydroelectricity or other forms of grid energy storage such as compressed air energy storage and thermal energy storage can store energy developed by high-wind periods and release it when needed. The type of storage needed depends on the wind penetration level – low penetration requires daily storage, and high penetration requires both short- and long-term storage – as long as a month or more. Stored energy increases the economic value of wind energy since it can be shifted to displace higher-cost generation during peak demand periods. The potential revenue from this arbitrage can offset the cost and losses of storage. Although pumped-storage power systems are only about 75% efficient and have high installation costs, their low running costs and ability to reduce the required electrical base-load can save both fuel and total electrical generation costs.

Energy payback 

The energy needed to build a wind farm divided into the total output over its life, Energy Return on Energy Invested, of wind power varies, but averages about 20–25. Thus, the energy payback time is typically around a year.

Economics

Onshore wind is an inexpensive source of electric power, cheaper than coal plants and new gas plants. According to BusinessGreen, wind turbines reached grid parity (the point at which the cost of wind power matches traditional sources) in some areas of Europe in the mid-2000s, and in the US around the same time. Falling prices continue to drive the Levelized cost down and it has been suggested that it has reached general grid parity in Europe in 2010, and will reach the same point in the US around 2016 due to an expected reduction in capital costs of about 12%. In 2021, the CEO of Siemens Gamesa warned that increased demand for low-cost wind turbines combined with high input costs and high costs of steel result in increased pressure on the manufacturers and decreasing profit margins.

Northern Eurasia, Canada, some parts of the United States, and Patagonia in Argentina are the best areas for onshore wind: whereas in other parts of the world solar power, or a combination of wind and solar, tend to be cheaper.

Electric power cost and trends

Wind power is capital intensive but has no fuel costs. The price of wind power is therefore much more stable than the volatile prices of fossil fuel sources. However, the estimated average cost per unit of electric power must incorporate the cost of construction of the turbine and transmission facilities, borrowed funds, return to investors (including the cost of risk), estimated annual production, and other components, averaged over the projected useful life of the equipment, which may be more than 20 years. Energy cost estimates are highly dependent on these assumptions so published cost figures can differ substantially.

The presence of wind energy, even when subsidized, can reduce costs for consumers (€5 billion/yr in Germany) by reducing the marginal price, by minimizing the use of expensive peaking power plants.

The cost has decreased as wind turbine technology has improved. There are now longer and lighter wind turbine blades, improvements in turbine performance, and increased power generation efficiency. Also, wind project capital expenditure costs and maintenance costs have continued to decline.

In 2021, a Lazard study of unsubsidized electricity said that wind power levelized cost of electricity continues to fall but more slowly than before. The study estimated new wind-generated electricity cost from $26 to $50/MWh, compared to new gas power from $45 to $74/MWh. The median cost of fully deprecated existing coal power was $42/MWh, nuclear $29/MWh and gas $24/MWh. The study estimated offshore wind at around $83/MWh. Compound annual growth rate was 4% per year from 2016 to 2021, compared to 10% per year from 2009 to 2021.

Incentives and community benefits
Turbine prices have fallen significantly in recent years due to tougher competitive conditions such as the increased use of energy auctions, and the elimination of subsidies in many markets. As of 2021, subsidies are still often given to offshore wind. But they are generally no longer necessary for onshore wind in countries with even a very low carbon price such as China, provided there are no competing fossil fuel subsidies.

Secondary market forces provide incentives for businesses to use wind-generated power, even if there is a premium price for the electricity. For example, socially responsible manufacturers pay utility companies a premium that goes to subsidize and build new wind power infrastructure. Companies use wind-generated power, and in return, they can claim that they are undertaking strong "green" efforts. Wind projects provide local taxes, or payments in place of taxes and strengthen the economy of rural communities by providing income to farmers with wind turbines on their land.

The wind energy sector can also produce jobs during the construction and operating phase. Jobs include the manufacturing of wind turbines and the construction process, which includes transporting, installing, and then maintaining the turbines. An estimated 1.25 million people were employed in wind power in 2020.

Small-scale wind power

Small-scale wind power is the name given to wind generation systems with the capacity to produce up to 50 kW of electrical power. Isolated communities, that may otherwise rely on diesel generators, may use wind turbines as an alternative. Individuals may purchase these systems to reduce or eliminate their dependence on grid electric power for economic reasons, or to reduce their carbon footprint. Wind turbines have been used for household electric power generation in conjunction with battery storage over many decades in remote areas.

Examples of small-scale wind power projects in an urban setting can be found in New York City, where, since 2009, several building projects have capped their roofs with Gorlov-type helical wind turbines. Although the energy they generate is small compared to the buildings' overall consumption, they help to reinforce the building's 'green' credentials in ways that "showing people your high-tech boiler" cannot, with some of the projects also receiving the direct support of the New York State Energy Research and Development Authority.

Grid-connected domestic wind turbines may use grid energy storage, thus replacing purchased electric power with locally produced power when available. The surplus power produced by domestic microgenerators can, in some jurisdictions, be fed into the network and sold to the utility company, producing a retail credit for the microgenerators' owners to offset their energy costs.

Off-grid system users can either adapt to intermittent power or use batteries, photovoltaic, or diesel systems to supplement the wind turbine. Equipment such as parking meters, traffic warning signs, street lighting, or wireless Internet gateways may be powered by a small wind turbine, possibly combined with a photovoltaic system, that charges a small battery replacing the need for a connection to the power grid.

Distributed generation from renewable resources is increasing as a consequence of the increased awareness of climate change. The electronic interfaces required to connect renewable generation units with the utility system can include additional functions, such as active filtering to enhance the power quality.

Airborne wind turbines, such as kites, can be used in places at risk of hurricanes, as they can be taken down in advance.

Impact on environment and landscape 

The environmental impact of electricity generation from wind power is minor when compared to that of fossil fuel power. Wind turbines have some of the lowest life-cycle greenhouse-gas emissions of energy sources: far less greenhouse gas is emitted than for the average unit of electricity, so wind power helps limit climate change. Use of engineered wood may allow carbon negative wind power. Wind power consumes no fuel, and emits no local air pollution, unlike fossil fuel power sources.

Onshore wind farms can have a significant visual impact. Due to a very low surface power density and spacing requirements, wind farms typically need to be spread over more land than other power stations. Their network of turbines, access roads, transmission lines, and substations can result in "energy sprawl";  although land between the turbines and roads can still be used for agriculture. They also need to be built away from urban areas,which can lead to "industrialization of the countryside". Some wind farms are opposed for potentially spoiling protected scenic areas, archaeological landscapes and heritage sites. A report by the Mountaineering Council of Scotland concluded that wind farms harmed tourism in areas known for natural landscapes and panoramic views.

Habitat loss and fragmentation are the greatest potential impacts on wildlife of onshore wind farms, but the worldwide ecological impact is minimal. Thousands of birds and bats, including rare species, have been killed by wind turbine blades, though wind turbines are responsible for far fewer bird deaths than fossil-fueled power stations. This can be mitigated with proper wildlife monitoring.

Many wind turbine blades are made of fiberglass, and have a lifetime of 20 years. Blades are hollow: some blades are crushed to reduce their volume and then landfilled. Blade end-of-life is complicated, and blades manufactured in the 2020s are more likely to be designed to be completely recyclable.

Wind turbines also generate noise. At , they become inaudible. There are anecdotal reports of negative health effects on people who live very close to wind turbines. Peer-reviewed research has generally not supported these claims.

Politics

Central government 

Although wind turbines with fixed bases are a mature technology and new installations are generally no longer subsidized, floating wind turbines are a relatively new technology so some governments subsidize them, for example to use deeper waters.

Fossil fuel subsidies by some governments are slowing the growth of renewables.

Permitting of wind farms can take years and some governments are trying to speed up - the wind industry says this will help limit climate change and increase energy security - sometimes groups such as fishers resist this but governments say that rules protecting biodiversity will still be followed.

Public opinion 
Surveys of public attitudes across Europe and in many other countries show strong public support for wind power. Bakker et al. (2012) found in their study that residents who did not want turbines built near them suffered significantly more stress than those who "benefited economically from wind turbines".

Although wind power is a popular form of energy generation, onshore or near offshore wind farms are sometimes opposed for their impact on the landscape (especially scenic areas, heritage areas and archaeological landscapes), as well as noise, and impact on tourism.

In other cases, there is direct community ownership of wind farms. The hundreds of thousands of people who have become involved in Germany's small and medium-sized wind farms demonstrate such support there.

A 2010 Harris Poll found strong support for wind power in Germany, other European countries, and the United States.

Public support in the United States has decreased from 75% in 2020 to 62% in 2021, with the Democrat Party supporting the use of wind energy twice as much as the Republican Party. President Biden has signed an executive order to begin building large scale wind farms.

In China, Shen et al. (2019) found that Chinese city-dwellers may be resistant to building wind turbines in urban areas, with a surprisingly high proportion of people citing an unfounded fear of radiation as driving their concerns.  Also, the study finds that like their counterparts in OECD countries, urban Chinese respondents are sensitive to direct costs and wildlife externalities. Distributing relevant information about turbines to the public may alleviate resistance.

Community 

Many wind power companies work with local communities to reduce environmental and other concerns associated with particular wind farms.
In other cases there is direct community ownership of wind farm projects. Appropriate government consultation, planning and approval procedures also help to minimize environmental risks.
Some may still object to wind farms but many say their concerns should be weighed against the need to address the threats posed by air pollution, climate change and the opinions of the broader community.

In the US, wind power projects are reported to boost local tax bases, helping to pay for schools, roads, and hospitals, and to revitalize the economies of rural communities by providing steady income to farmers and other landowners.

In the UK, both the National Trust and the Campaign to Protect Rural England have expressed concerns about the effects on the rural landscape caused by inappropriately sited wind turbines and wind farms.

Some wind farms have become tourist attractions. The Whitelee Wind Farm Visitor Centre has an exhibition room, a learning hub, a café with a viewing deck and also a shop. It is run by the Glasgow Science Centre.

In Denmark, a loss-of-value scheme gives people the right to claim compensation for loss of value of their property if it is caused by proximity to a wind turbine. The loss must be at least 1% of the property's value.

Despite this general support for the concept of wind power in the public at large, local opposition often exists and has delayed or aborted a number of projects.
As well as concerns about the landscape, there are concerns that some installations can produce excessive sound and vibration levels leading to a decrease in property values. A study of 50,000 home sales near wind turbines found no statistical evidence that prices were affected.

While aesthetic issues are subjective and some find wind farms pleasant and optimistic, or symbols of energy independence and local prosperity, protest groups are often formed to attempt to block some wind power stations for various reasons.

Some opposition to wind farms is dismissed as NIMBYism, but research carried out in 2009 found that there is little evidence to support the belief that residents only object to wind farms because of a "Not in my Back Yard" attitude.

Geopolitics 
Wind cannot be cut off unlike oil and gas so can contribute to energy security.

Turbine design 

Wind turbines are devices that convert the wind's kinetic energy into electrical power. The result of over a millennium of windmill development and modern engineering, today's wind turbines are manufactured in a wide range of horizontal axis and vertical axis types. The smallest turbines are used for applications such as battery charging for auxiliary power. Slightly larger turbines can be used for making small contributions to a domestic power supply while selling unused power back to the utility supplier via the electrical grid. Arrays of large turbines, known as wind farms, have become an increasingly important source of renewable energy and are used in many countries as part of a strategy to reduce their reliance on fossil fuels.

Wind turbine design is the process of defining the form and specifications of a wind turbine to extract energy from the wind.
A wind turbine installation consists of the necessary systems needed to capture the wind's energy, point the turbine into the wind, convert mechanical rotation into electrical power, and other systems to start, stop, and control the turbine.

In 1919, the German physicist Albert Betz showed that for a hypothetical ideal wind-energy extraction machine, the fundamental laws of conservation of mass and energy allowed no more than 16/27 (59%) of the kinetic energy of the wind to be captured. This Betz limit can be approached in modern turbine designs, which may reach 70 to 80% of the theoretical Betz limit.

The aerodynamics of a wind turbine are not straightforward. The airflow at the blades is not the same as the airflow far away from the turbine. The very nature of how energy is extracted from the air also causes air to be deflected by the turbine. This affects the objects or other turbines downstream, which is known as "wake effect". Also, the aerodynamics of a wind turbine at the rotor surface exhibit phenomena that are rarely seen in other aerodynamic fields. The shape and dimensions of the blades of the wind turbine are determined by the aerodynamic performance required to efficiently extract energy from the wind, and by the strength required to resist the forces on the blade.

In addition to the aerodynamic design of the blades, the design of a complete wind power system must also address the design of the installation's rotor hub, nacelle, tower structure, generator, controls, and foundation.

History 

Wind power has been used as long as humans have put sails into the wind. King Hammurabi's Codex (reign 1792 - 1750 BC) already mentioned windmills for generating mechanical energy. Wind-powered machines used to grind grain and pump water, the windmill and wind pump, were developed in what is now Iran, Afghanistan, and Pakistan by the 9th century. Wind power was widely available and not confined to the banks of fast-flowing streams, or later, requiring sources of fuel. Wind-powered pumps drained the polders of the Netherlands, and in arid regions such as the American mid-west or the Australian outback, wind pumps provided water for livestock and steam engines.

The first windmill used for the production of electric power was built in Scotland in July 1887 by Prof James Blyth of Anderson's College, Glasgow (the precursor of Strathclyde University). Blyth offered the surplus electric power to the people of Marykirk for lighting the main street, however, they turned down the offer as they thought electric power was "the work of the devil." Although he later built a wind turbine to supply emergency power to the local Lunatic Asylum, Infirmary, and Dispensary of Montrose, the invention never really caught on as the technology was not considered to be economically viable.

Across the Atlantic, in Cleveland, Ohio, a larger and heavily engineered machine was designed and constructed in the winter of 1887–1888 by Charles F. Brush. This was built by his engineering company at his home and operated from 1886 until 1900. The Brush wind turbine had a rotor  in diameter and was mounted on an  tower. Although large by today's standards, the machine was only rated at 12 kW. The connected dynamo was used either to charge a bank of batteries or to operate up to 100 incandescent light bulbs, three arc lamps, and various motors in Brush's laboratory.

With the development of electric power, wind power found new applications in lighting buildings remote from centrally generated power. Throughout the 20th century parallel paths developed small wind stations suitable for farms or residences. The 1973 oil crisis triggered the investigation in Denmark and the United States that led to larger utility-scale wind generators that could be connected to electric power grids for remote use of power. By 2008, the U.S. installed capacity had reached 25.4 gigawatts, and by 2012 the installed capacity was 60 gigawatts. Today, wind-powered generators operate in every size range between tiny stations for battery charging at isolated residences, up to gigawatt-sized offshore wind farms that provide electric power to national electrical networks.

See also 

 100% renewable energy
 Airborne wind turbine
 Global Wind Day
 Hydrogen economy
 List of countries by electricity production from renewable sources
 List of wind turbine manufacturers
 Lists of offshore wind farms by country
 Lists of wind farms by country
 Outline of wind energy
 Wind resource assessment
 Wind power by country

Notes

References

External links 

  of Global Wind Energy Council (GWEC)
 Wind from Project Regeneration
  of World Wind Energy Association (WWEA)
 Dynamic Data Dashboard from the International Energy Agency
 Current global map of wind power density

Bright green environmentalism
 
Renewable energy

ja:風力